Kay Duncan, (born Lesley Duncan) is a drama teacher and former broadcaster, who previously worked as an in-vision continuity announcer for Grampian Television (now STV North) between 1985 and 1992.

Alongside announcing duties, Duncan read regional news bulletins (Grampian Headlines) and presented regional programmes for the station, such as A Touch of Music, Summer at Six and North Tonight Summer Edition.

Duncan went freelance in 1992, and eventually left Grampian TV. She went on to teach drama at Portlethen Academy, using her married name, Lesley McKay.

References

Radio and television announcers
People from Aberdeen
Living people
Year of birth missing (living people)